Goblin King is the name of different supervillains appearing in American comic books published by Marvel Comics.

Fictional character biography

Norman Osborn

Norman Osborn is the first character to use the Goblin King alias. When the children that work for the Vulture are discussing what to do after the Superior Spider-Man (Otto Octavius's mind in Spider-Man's body) brutally defeats the Vulture, he approaches the children and tells the group that he will be the one that crushes Superior Spider-Man. He is later shown having gathered a new gang of followers together in the sewers formed from discarded members of other villains' gangs like the Vulture, the Owl and the third White Dragon's gangs; these henchmen escaped their organizations unharmed because Superior Spider-Man is more focused on the larger threats (where the original Spider-Man would focus on individuals).

While building an army to attack the Superior Spider-Man, he acts as the Goblin King. The Hand ninjas who evaded capture arrive at the sewers and join up with the Goblin Nation. The group revels in the news that, thanks to Superior Spider-Man's assault, the Goblin King now owns over half of New York's organized crime. He claims he now owns New York City as the Goblin Kingpin of Crime. With the help of Menace, the Goblin King later releases Phil Urich from a prison transport and upgrades the latter's Goblin armor and weapons, asking in return only that his enforcer's only identity from here on shall be Goblin Knight. The Goblin King trains the Goblin Knight, anxious to confront the Superior Spider-Man. The Goblin King later poses as the Hobgoblin and is sighted by some of the Spiderlings.

Upon Carlie Cooper being brought to the Goblin King's lair by Menace, he receives Carlie's journal from Menace which reveals to him that Octavius's mind is in his nemesis's body. The Goblin King douses Carlie with the Goblin formula, causing the woman to mutate into the new superhuman villain Monster. He demands to know Spider-Man's identity, but Monster first asks the Goblin King to reveal his own identity. The Goblin King assures Monster that he is Osborn, but refuses to remove his mask until Carlie has proven a loyal follower and dispatches Monster and Menace on a mission. The Goblin King battles and kills the Hobgoblin, although the Goblin Knight discovers that it was the butler Claude with Roderick Kingsley still in hiding abroad.

Having staged a coup of New York after spreading his resources by exploiting the Superior Spider-Man's reliance on technology, the Goblin King directly confronts the Superior Spider-Man, angry that he was cheated out of the opportunity to defeat his nemesis, but offering the Superior Spider-Man the chance to join him and the former rejects the offer. With the Superior Spider-Man unable to win against Goblin King's resources, having had various allies abandoned, and with faith in his own abilities gone, Octavius sacrifices himself to restore the original Spider-Man's mind in order to save Anna Maria Marconi. Spider-Man arrives for the final confrontation to which the Goblin King quickly realizes that the original Spider-Man is back when responding to his nemesis' taunts with his own wisecracks. In the duel that follows, Spider-Man unmasks the Goblin King, learning that he has undergone plastic surgery to change his appearance, acting as Alchemax's CEO and intending to re-establish himself as businessman Mason Banks, now that Osborn has become too publicly known as a supervillain. Spider-Man defeats and strips the villain of his powers with a serum devised by Octavius, but Osborn manages to escape through Liz Allan's discreet aid. In hiding once again, he reflects that the various heroes will be unprepared for him when he returns with his new identity and approach as a businessman, seemingly no longer afflicted by the mental illness associated with the Goblin formula.

Phil Urich

Philip "Phil" Urich is the second character to use the Goblin King alias. Following the conclusion of The Superior Spider-Man storyline where the true Spider-Man returns, he now leads the Goblin Nation's remnants as the self-proclaimed Goblin King. He meets with Mister Negative where they wait for Eel to show up in order to divide the criminal underground following his predecessor's defeat. The meeting is crashed by the Black Cat and Electro. Black Cat mentions to the Goblin King and Mister Negative that Spider-Man had outed them and wants a share in their plans.

During the "AXIS" storyline, the Goblin King attempts to rescue Lily Hollister from a police transport; this mission goes awry and Lily is rendered amnesiac. When the Goblin King confronts Kingsley in the latter's headquarters, the Queen Cat comes to the defense. The Goblin King recognizes Hollister as the Queen Cat, but Lily does not recognize him. Following the attack, Missile Mate is convinced by the Goblin King that the Hobgoblin would soon abandon the heroes that were trained. Missile Mate goes to the Goblin Nation's headquarters and asks the Goblin King to join and be a supervillain. The Goblin King is reluctant, but Missile Mate shows him that he has also gathered all the supervillains that the Hobgoblin had "abandoned" (consisting of 8-Ball III, Killer Shrike II, Melter III, Tiger Shark II, and Unicorn IV) after becoming a good guy. While the celebration of Hobgoblin Day is being held with a parade in Kingsley's honor, Missile Mate betrays the Hobgoblin and attempts to murder in the Goblin King's name. Kingsley, however, had already expected the betrayal and had been using a hologram decoy which took Missile Mate's blow. As soon as Kinglsey confronts Missile Mate, the Goblin King appears with his Goblin Nation and attacks the celebration. The Hobgoblin bests the Goblin King in combat and delivers him and the Goblin Nation members with him to the authorities.

Having escaped prison under undisclosed circumstances during the "Go Down Swinging" storyline, the Goblin King raids an old gentlemen's club to acquire the Goblin weaponry stored there, but Norman Osborn- currently wielding the Carnage symbiote's power- apparently kills Urich by tearing his heart out.

Other versions
In the pages of Avataars: Covenant of the Shield, the Goblin King is a goblin who is that world's version of Green Goblin.

In other media
 The Norman Osborn version of the Goblin King appears in the Ultimate Spider-Man episode "Nightmare on Christmas", voiced by Steven Weber. This version wears medieval armour and has ram-like horns. In an alternate reality which is actually Nightmare's illusion, he rules New York at Oscorp with his own Spider-Soldier army as personal enforcers and 'trophies' after having defeated and killed most of the Earth's heroes: Iron Man's armor, Black Widow's gauntlets, Captain America's shield, Falcon's wings and Thor's hammer. The Goblin King fights Spider-Man who defeats him in an intense battle.
 A variation of the Goblin King appears in the Spider-Man four-part episode "Goblin War" as the alter-ego of Adrian Toomes (voiced by Alastair Duncan). This version is the Goblin Nation's leader, sporting a green Goblin battle suit and later utilities a giant mech which controls technology.

References

Fictional goblins
Marvel Comics supervillains
Set index articles on comics